Stina Leicht (born March 29, 1972) is an American science fiction and fantasy fiction author living in central Texas.  She was nominated for the Campbell Award in 2012 and 2013, and was shortlisted for the Crawford Award in 2012.  She is also one of the regular hosts of the Skiffy and Fanty Show.

Bibliography

Novels
 Of Blood and Honey, (2011), NightShade Books
 And Blue Skies from Pain, (2012), NightShade Books
 Cold Iron, (2015), SAGA Press
 Blackthorne (novel)|Blackthorne, (2017), SAGA Press
 Persephone Station, (2021)

Short fiction
 Last Drink Bird Head, (2008), Jeff VanderMeer, ed.
 Texas Died for Somebody's Sins But Not Mine, (2013), appearing in Rayguns Over Texas, Rick Klaw, ed.

References

External links

American women writers
Living people
American science fiction writers
Women science fiction and fantasy writers
21st-century American women
1972 births